The 1997 French motorcycle Grand Prix was the sixth round of the 1997 Grand Prix motorcycle racing season. It took place on 8 June 1997 at Circuit Paul Ricard.

500 cc classification

250 cc classification

125 cc classification

References

French motorcycle Grand Prix
French
Motorcycle Grand Prix